Name                    : XXXV Thailand National Games

Province participating  : 76 Provinces

Athletes participating  : ---

Events                  : 33 sports

Opening ceremony        : September 9, 2006

Closing ceremony        : September 19, 2006

Stadium                 : Suphan Buri Province Central Stadium

Sports

 Aquatics (Swimming)
 Athletics
 Badminton
 Baseball
 Basketball
 Billiards and Snooker
 Bodybuilding
 Boxing
 Cycling (Track, Road, and Mountain biking)
 Dancesport
 Football
 Go (game)
 Golf
 Gymnastics (Artistic and Rhythmic)
 Handball
 Hoop takraw
 Judo
 Kabaddi
 Muay Thai
 Netball
 Pétanque
 Rowing
 Rugby football
 Sepak takraw
 Shooting
 Softball
 Taekwondo
 Table tennis
 Tennis
 Volleyball (Indoor and Beach)
 Weightlifting
 Wrestling
 Wushu

Top ten medals

External links
Official Website of the 35th Thailand National Games in Suphan Buri

National Games
Thailand National Games
National Games
Thailand National Games
National Games